Futuci Pagoda is a wooden pagoda that was built in Xuzhou during the Three Kingdoms period (220-280) in China.

References

Pagodas in China
Wooden buildings and structures in China